Altero Matteoli (8 September 1940 – 18 December 2017) was an Italian politician.

Political career
Born in Cecina, he has been a member of the Italian Social Movement and National Alliance. He was a member of the Chamber of Deputies from 1983 to 2006 and a Senator from 2006 to 2017.

He served as Minister of the Environment in the second and in the third Berlusconi Cabinet. He also served as Minister of Infrastructure and Transport in the fourth Berlusconi Cabinet. He has been Mayor of Orbetello from 2006 to 2011.

He died in a car accident on 18 December 2017.

References

External links
  Personal profile at the Senate of the Republic website

1940 births
2017 deaths
People from Cecina, Tuscany
Italian Social Movement politicians
20th-century Italian politicians
National Alliance (Italy) politicians
The People of Freedom politicians
Forza Italia politicians
Politicians of Tuscany
Environment ministers of Italy
Road incident deaths in Italy